Air Zonk, known in Japan as , is a horizontally scrolling shooter released for TurboGrafx-16 in 1992. Air Zonk was an attempt to update the company's image via a modern, punkish character called Zonk, who bears a purposeful resemblance to the TurboGrafx-16's caveman mascot, Bonk.

The game was developed by Red Company, the original creators of the Bonk series, also known for their Gate of Thunder series. Air Zonk features King Drool, antagonist of the Bonk series, along with many other enemies from the series. It was followed by a sequel in 1993 called Super Air Zonk: Rockabilly-Paradise for the TurboDuo, and has been released on the Wii's Virtual Console.

Gameplay
Air Zonk is a re-imagination of the Bonk video game series as a scrolling shooter set in the future. Artistically the game is lighthearted, featuring humorous designs of the environment and the characters.  During each of the five levels, the gameplay centers around the effective use of shooting and bombing to complete a stage. At the start, the player may pick a companion character to team up with, such as anthropomorphic gumball machine or mummy with a drill attached to its head, in order to boost the Bonk's powers. The players can choose to limit the use of the designated companion characters for each level, or opt out of using companion characters altogether. Each companion character, or friend, can only be used once. Air Zonk takes on the distinct visual style that is sometimes called a "cute 'em up". There are three difficulty settings: sweet, spicy, and bitter.

Zonk can charge his shots, which allows him to fire a more powerful attack. Charging longer causes Zonk to drop a bomb, which damages all enemies on the screen. Zonk can also acquire seven types of power-ups, each of which can also be charged for a unique special attack. As usual for scrolling shooters, whenever Zonk acquires a new power-up, he loses the current one. If Zonk is hit while he has a power-up, he loses the power-up but does not die, except in the case of the Mini-Zonk power-up. The Mini-Zonk power-up also differs from the other power-ups in that it cannot be charged, and can be found in both florets and random enemy drops (other power-ups can only be found in florets).

Zonk starts each stage alone and with no power-ups. He must collect eight smiley faces, the eighth of which will appear in giant form with sunglasses, in order to get his friend to join him. The friend initially acts as a Gradius-style support which follows Zonk around shooting projectiles. If the player collects another eight smiley faces, Zonk and the friend will merge into a hybrid form, granting a new attack and 20 seconds of invulnerability. This new attack cannot be charged, and Zonk cannot drop bombs while in hybrid form. Once invincibility expires, if Zonk is hit he will revert to normal form and his friend will leave, though he retains whatever power-up he had before changing to hybrid form.

Reception
 

Air Zonk was awarded Best TurboGrafx Game of 1992 by Electronic Gaming Monthly.
The game retrospectively has gained a cult following. Air Zonk is often considered by many game critics to be one of the best games released for the TurboGrafx-16.

Legacy
Air Zonk received a sequel in 1993 named  Super Air Zonk: Rockabilly-Paradise (also known as CD Denjin Rockabilly), which was released in the SuperCD format and requires the Super System Card to play on first-generation TurboGrafx-CD consoles. As its name would imply, the game has a CD audio soundtrack consisting of rockabilly music. The game contains all-new levels, assistants, and enemies.

Air Zonk was released in 2007 on the Wii's Virtual Console in May in Japan, July in America, and on July 13 in Europe. It has gained an E rating from the ESRB. It was also released on the Wii U's Virtual Console in Japan on June 19, 2014, in America on July 27, 2017, and in Europe on August 3, 2017.

References

External links 
 The Bonk Compendium (Covering all games and references to Bonk and Air Zonk)
 Detailed information for "Air Zonk" at the PC Engine Software Bible
 Air Zonk featured in 1-up's "Stchick 'em up" article
 Information on Super Air Zonk

1992 video games
Horizontally scrolling shooters
TurboGrafx-16 games
Video games developed in Japan
Virtual Console games
Virtual Console games for Wii U
Fictional cyborgs
Hudson Soft games
Video game spin-offs
Single-player video games